Japanese football in 1936.

Emperor's Cup

National team

Results

Players statistics

Births
January 11 - Masashi Watanabe
January 30 - Koji Sasaki
May 26 - Hiroshi Saeki
December 3 - Saburo Kawabuchi

External links

 
Seasons in Japanese football